The United States has had a two-party system for much of its history, and the two major parties have nominated vice presidential candidates in most presidential elections. Since the ratification of the United States Constitution in 1789, there have been 59 unsuccessful major party candidates for Vice President of the United States. Eight other individuals have served as the main running mate to a third party or independent presidential candidate who won at least ten percent of the popular or electoral vote.

Prior to the ratification of the Twelfth Amendment in 1804, each member of the Electoral College cast two votes for president; whichever individual who won the most electoral votes would become president, while the individual with the second-most electoral votes would become vice president. In the elections of 1792, 1796, and 1800, at least one of the major parties ran a candidate whom they intended to elect vice president. The Twelfth Amendment changed the presidential election process, requiring members of the Electoral College to cast separate votes for president and vice president. Since then, the two major parties have almost always nominated a ticket consisting of a single presidential candidate and a single vice presidential candidate. Before the election of 1832, both major parties used a congressional nominating caucus, or nominations by state legislatures, to determine presidential and vice presidential candidates. Since 1840, each major party has consistently nominated a single ticket at their respective presidential nominating conventions.

The two current major parties are the Democratic Party and the Republican Party. At various points prior to the American Civil War, the Federalist Party, the Democratic-Republican Party, the National Republican Party, and the Whig Party were major parties. In the 1872 presidential election, the Liberal Republican Party put forward an unsuccessful major party vice presidential nominee, Benjamin Gratz Brown. Brown and his running mate, Horace Greeley, were also nominated by the Democratic Party.

List of unsuccessful major party candidates

These unsuccessful vice presidential candidates served as the main running mate of a major party presidential candidate who competed in multiple states, or they were a major party's main vice presidential candidate in multiple states.

 * indicates that the candidate served as Vice President of the United States at some point in their career

List of unsuccessful major third party and independent candidates

These third party and independent candidates won at least ten percent of the electoral vote for vice president, or served as the main running mate to a third party or independent presidential candidate who won at least ten percent of the popular vote for president.

See also
 List of people who received an electoral vote in the United States Electoral College
 List of United States Electoral College results
 List of vice presidents of the United States
 List of unsuccessful major party candidates for President of the United States

Notes

References

Works cited

 
 
 
 
 
 
 
 
 
 
 
 
 

Political history of the United States
Presidential elections in the United States
United States presidential history